Afortunadamente No Eres Tú is the second album by the Mexican singer Paty Cantú, released in 2010.

Track listing
 Afortunadamente No Eres Tú
 Goma De Mascar
 Clavo Que Saca Otro Clavo
 Se Desintegra El Amor
 Vuelve A Amarme
 No-Oh Se Apaga
 Fe
 La Que Está En Vez De Mí
 Fue Sólo Sexo
 No Tengo Miedo
 De Nuevo
 Se Desintegra El Amor (Versión Acústica) (Only in iTunes)

Charts

Weekly charts

Year-end charts

References

Paty Cantú albums
2010 albums